Thornton Township High School District 205 is a consolidated high school district based in South Holland, Illinois that serves much of Cook County's Thornton Township. The district is located south of the city of Chicago; the township's northern border matches up with the southern border of the city proper. District 205 is composed of three high schools, all located in different towns throughout Thornton Township. Thornton Township High School is located in the western reaches of Thornton Township in the Village of Harvey, and is led by principal Mr. Tony Ratliff. Another high school in the district is Thornridge High School in the City of Dolton, a village located at the northern border of the township. The principal of Thornridge High School is Dr. Justin Moore. the third district school is Thornwood High School, which is located in the township seat of South Holland; Thornwood's principal is Dr. Don C. Holmes. The district superintendent is Nathaniel Cunningham.

External links
District website

References

School districts in Cook County, Illinois